Licypriya Kangujam (Meitei pronunciation: /lī-sī-prī-yā kāng-ngū-jam/ ; born 2 October 2011) is a child environmental activist from India. She is one of the youngest climate activists globally and has addressed world leaders at the 2019 United Nations Climate Change Conference in Madrid, Spain asking them to take immediate climate action. She has been accused of faking multiple awards to bolster her image. Licypriya has been campaigning for climate action in India since 2018, to pass new laws to curb India's high pollution levels, and to make climate-change literacy mandatory in schools.

She has been regarded as India's Greta Thunberg, though she does not like the usage of this term. The Times of India published an exclusive report titled “Is India’s Greta Thunberg a pawn in the hands of an unscrupulous father?” on the various controversies surrounding Licypriya. The report exposes the credibility of the awards claimed to be received by Licypriya. Another media outlet has also questioned the credibility of these awards.

Licypriya started advocating against climate change in July 2018. On 21 June 2019 inspired by the climate activist Greta Thunberg, Licypriya started spending a week outside the Indian parliament House to draw the attention of Prime Minister Narendra Modi to pass a climate change law in India. On 31 August 2019, Licypriya received the "World Children Peace Prize 2019" handed over by Charles Allen, Director of Partnerships of Global Peace Index – Institute of Economics & Peace (IEP), Australia in an event organized by the Regional Alliance of Fostering Youth and Ministry of Youth Sports and Community Empowerment, Government of Maldives. However, The Times of India reported, “Even the World Children Peace Prize Award given to Licypriya in 2019 and promoted as an honour granted by the Global Peace Index turned out to be a sham after the Institute for Economics and Peace clarified on Twitter that “we do not issue awards”.

She was also honored with the title "Rising Star" by the Earth Day Network headquarters based in Washington, D.C., USA.

On 19 November 2019, she received the "SDGs Ambassador Award 2019" at Chandigarh University by Dainik Bhaskar in collaboration with NITI Aayog, Government of India. Licypriya also received the "Global Child Prodigy Award 2020" on 3 January 2020 in New Delhi by Lieutenant Governor of Pondicherry Kiran Bedi.

On 18 February 2020, she addressed the TEDxSBSC held in Delhi University, New Delhi, India. On 23 February 2020 she addressed the TEDxGateway held in Mumbai and received a standing ovation for her speech. She addressed TEDx talks for the six times by the time she was nine years old.

Life
Licypriya Kangujam was born on 2 October 2011 in Bashikhong, Manipur, India, the eldest daughter of Kanarjit Kangujam and Bidyarani Devi Kangujam Ongbi, in a family of Meitei ethnicity. She began raising her voice to combat climate change and disaster risk reduction, when she was seven. In June 2019, she protested in front of the Parliament House of India addressing the Prime Minister of India Narendra Modi to enact the climate change law in India. Her father Kanarjit Kangujam Singh was arrested on 31 May 2021 as he had allegedly duped several self-help groups, hotels and individuals of more than Rs 19 lakh for a Global Youth Meet that he had organised in Imphal in 2014. Nearly a hundred children from 12 countries claim Kanarjit Kangujam scammed them.

2018–2019 activism

Visits to Mongolia
In 2018, Licypriya attended a UN disaster conference in Mongolia along with her father. This inspired her to get involved in activism. In an article in the BBC News she stated "I got lots of inspiration and new knowledge from the people giving speeches. It was a life-changing event." Licypriya founded the "Child Movement" soon after the event to raise awareness to protect the planet by tackling climate change and natural disasters.

Visits to Africa
Kangujam attended the UNESCO Partners' Forum 2019 (Biennial Luanda) in Luanda, Angola invited by UNESCO, African Union & Government of Angola. She addressed on climate change along with President of Angola João Lourenço, President of Mali Ibrahim Boubacar Keïta, President of Malawi Hage Geingob, President of Republic of the Congo Denis Sassou Nguesso, First Lady of Angola Ana Dias Lourenço, First Lady of Namibia Monica Geingos, Nobel Peace Prize Laureate 2018 Denis Mukwege, UNESCO Director General Audrey Azoulay, Deputy Prime Minister of Guinea François Lonseny Fall and all Culture Ministers of Africa.

Kerala Flood 2018
Licypriya donated her savings of Rupees 100,000 to the Chief Minister of Kerala Pinarayi Vijayan on 24 August 2018 to help the flood victim children of Kerala Massive Flood. Two years later she received the acknowledgement letter from the Kerala Government.

Licypriya's donation to the Chief Minister supported their work in protecting children hit by the flood. She felt her small contribution would help make a difference to the children during the tough time.

Great October March 2019
On 21 October 2019, Licypriya started the "Great October March 2019" at India Gate, New Delhi with nearly thousands of her supporters. The Great October March took place from 21 to 27 October in various locations to request immediate action on climate change and to enact the climate law in India.

Survival Kit for the Future
Licypriya brought out a symbolic device called SUKIFU (Survival Kit for the Future) to curb the air pollution on 4 October 2019. SUKIFU is an almost zero budget kit designed from trash to provide fresh air to breathe when pollution is bad. This wearable plant is a recognition of the Green Movement for air pollution.
Anybody can build up this concept at home from the recycling trash to instill fresh air directly into our lungs. She launched it in front of the Punjab & Haryana Legislative Assembly House as a symbol of demonstration before the oath taking ceremony of newly elected Haryana MLAs & Ministers. She draws the attention of the leaders to find urgent solution for the current crisis of air pollution in Delhi & National Capital Region.
"
 
Further she added that the project is inspired by the air pollution problem in Delhi, and that she doesn't want its message to only be about the environment. Instead, it's about the same adaptability that caused her to come forward with a mission, the qualities of resilience that it takes to survive now and in the future. She developed the model with the support of Chandan Ghosh, professor at Indian Institute of Technology Jammu (IIT)."

COP25

Licypriya Kangujam addressed at COP25 urging the world leaders to act now on climate change. The United Nations Climate Conference was held to discuss the international action on climate change. 26,000 people from 196 countries attended this event. The event was held from 2 December to 13 December at IFEMA, Madrid, Spain, hosted by Government of Chile with the logistics support Of Government of Spain under the UNFCCC (United Nations Framework Convention on Climate Change).

Kangujam met the UN Secretary-General during The UN Climate Change Conference COP25 and submitted a memorandum "on behalf of the children of the world." The memorandum stated that she wants to create a better place for all children of the world. She was praised by the UN Secretary-General António Guterres. Greta Thunberg and several other global leaders participated during the event.

2020 activism

World Economic Forum 2020
In 2020, Licypriya published a letter to the participants at the World Economic Forum with activists Greta Thunberg, Luisa Neubauer, Isabelle Axelsson, and Loukina Tille, calling on companies, banks and governments to immediately stop subsidizing fossil fuels.
In an opinion piece given to The Guardian they said, "We don't want these things done by 2050, 2030 or even 2021, we want this done now – as in right now. We call upon the world’s leaders to stop investing in the fossil fuel economy that is at the very heart of this planetary crisis. Instead, they should invest their money in existing sustainable technologies, research and in restoring nature. Short-term profit should not trump long-term stability of life."

Campaign for teaching climate change in schools 
She has been campaigning to make lessons in climate change mandatory in schools and as per her request the government of Gujarat has included climate change in school education.

Earth Day 2020
In 2020 Licypriya addressed the gatherings globally on Earth Day 2020 at Washington, D.C., United States. The event was virtual, due to the outbreak of the COVID-19 pandemic. She featured with 50 other global leaders, influencers, celebrities, athletes and musicians including Pope Francis, Sylvia Earle, Denis Hayes, Bill McKibben, Global Advisory Committee Member Albert II (Price of Monaco), Alexandria Villaseñor, Al Gore, Patricia Espinosa, Christiana Figueres, Michelle Dilhara, Jerome Foster II, John Kerry, Thomas Lovejoy, Ed Begley Jr., Zac Efron, Anil Kapoor, Van Jones, Ricky Keij, Paul Nicklen and Alex Honnold, giving a message of hope to fight the ongoing climate crisis.

Controversy 
In a report done by The Times of India in June 2021, it was revealed that all of Licypriya’s awards from her initial days were given to her by her father’s organisations.

See also
Greta Thunberg
Severn Cullis-Suzuki – as a minor was also a notable environmental activist in 1992

References

External links
Licypriya Kangujam on South Asian Youth Summit
Licipriya Kangujam on Controversy
 Licypriya Kangujam on fake award controversy
 Licypriya Kangujam on award controversy

2011 births
Living people
Meitei people
Indian women environmentalists
Climate activists
Activists from Manipur
Indian children
Youth climate activists
Indian child activists